Polycyathus is a genus of small corals in the order Scleractinia, the stony corals. Most species occur in the Pacific Ocean.

Species
Species in the genus include:
 Polycyathus andamanensis Alcock, 1893
 Polycyathus atlanticus Duncan, 1876
 Polycyathus chaishanensis Lin et al., 2012
 Polycyathus difficilis Duncan, 1889
 Polycyathus fulvus Wijsman-Best, 1970
 Polycyathus furanaensis Verheij & Best, 1987
 Polycyathus fuscomarginatus (Klunzinger, 1879)
 Polycyathus hodgsoni Verheij & Best, 1987
 Polycyathus hondaensis (Durham & Barnard, 1952)
 Polycyathus isabela Wells, 1982
 Polycyathus marigondoni Verheij & Best, 1987
 Polycyathus mayae Cairns, 2000
 Polycyathus muellerae (Abel, 1959)
 Polycyathus norfolkensis Cairns, 1995
 Polycyathus octuplus Cairns, 1999
 Polycyathus palifera (Verrill, 1869)
 Polycyathus persicus (Duncan, 1876)
 Polycyathus senegalensis Chevalier, 1966
 Polycyathus verrilli Duncan, 1889

References

Caryophylliidae
Scleractinia genera